Daniel James Macdonnell Heap (September 24, 1925 – April 25, 2014) was a Canadian activist and politician. Heap served as a Member of Parliament with the New Democratic Party, a Toronto City Councillor, a political activist and an Anglican worker-priest. He represented the Toronto, Ontario, riding of Spadina (after 1988 Trinity—Spadina) from 1981 to 1993 and Ward 6 on Toronto City Council from 1972 to 1981. As an activist he was involved in the peace movement, community issues around housing, homelessness, poverty and refugee rights among other social justice issues.

Background
Heap was born on September 24, 1925, in Winnipeg, Manitoba, into a middle-class family, the second of four children. His father, Fred Heap, was a lawyer and his mother was a piano teacher. Heap's maternal grandfather was a Presbyterian minister inspiring Heap, from a young age, to want to take up the same calling.

Heap was raised a Presbyterian in a family that was concerned about social causes. When he was 6, the family decided to boycott Japanese oranges to protest the Japanese invasion of Manchuria.

For his last two years of high school, Heap attended Upper Canada College on a scholarship, and then studied classics and philosophy at Queen's University.

A pacifist, Heap nevertheless joined the Canadian Army during the Second World War due to his opposition to Nazism, later saying "It wasn't possible to be neutral in the face of Hitler". However, the war ended before he could be sent overseas.

In 1945, while working in a factory as a summer job, he met members of the Student Christian Movement and became a Christian socialist. He later also became a member of the Society of the Catholic Commonwealth and of the Co-operative Commonwealth Federation, forerunner of the New Democratic Party.

Heap studied theology at the University of Chicago for a year before becoming an Anglican and transferring to McGill University to pursue a divinity degree. While at McGill he became engaged to Alice Boomhour, a pacifist, activist in the SCM and CCF, and daughter of a United Church minister. They married in 1950. That same year, he was ordained a priest within the Anglican Church of Canada.

After working as a parish priest in Quebec for only a few years in the 1950s, Heap decided against a career as a church employee and aligned himself with the Worker-Priest movement which paired ministry with social activism. Heap moved his family to Toronto where he worked for 18 years as a labourer (cutter trimmer, later pressman) in a cardboard box factory in Toronto, where he became involved in the paperworker's union (later the Communications, Energy and Paperworkers Union of Canada which eventually merged to become part of UNIFOR) and was elected a union representative and attempted to "bring socialism to the Canadian worker".

He and Alice raised seven children, including son Danny Heap, a computer science lecturer at the University of Toronto.

In 1965, Heap marched with Martin Luther King Jr. on his Selma to Montgomery marches while the rest of his family participated in a solidarity sit-in in Toronto. The family also opened their home to Americans resisting the Vietnam War, youth involved with the SCM and other activists.

Politics
Heap entered politics and campaigned on a platform to oppose poverty, war and homelessness. He ran as the New Democratic Party's candidate in Spadina in the 1968 federal election placing second in a campaign where he described himself as a "worker priest".  He also ran in the 1971 provincial election against Allan Grossman in the riding of St. Andrew—St. Patrick, losing by 1137 votes. His first success in politics came when he was elected in the 1972 municipal election as the junior Alderman for Ward 6. As well as serving on Toronto City Council from 1972 to 1981, he also represented Ward 6 on Metro Toronto Council from 1974 to 1978. When the Liberal Member of Parliament for Spadina, Peter Stollery, was appointed to the Senate in 1981, Heap decided to run in the subsequent by-election. Prime Minister Pierre Trudeau had recommended Stollery for appointment to the Senate in order to open the "safe Liberal riding" for his aide Jim Coutts. Heap defeated Coutts in the by-election, however, and was re-elected in the 1984 and 1988 elections.  He retired at the 1993 federal election.

Heap was an outspoken MP, and campaigned against poverty, homelessness, and war. Upon being elected to parliament, he said his three priorities were world peace, worker control of the economy, and an end to social injustice. He served as NDP critic on immigration, served on the member of the House of Commons Standing Committee on Labour, Employment and Immigration, and was a prominent spokesperson for social justice issues both in Canada and abroad. He was very concerned with issues such as refugees, the situations in Central America, East Timor, and South Africa.   Heap hired a young Olivia Chow as his constituency office assistant.

Later life
Despite retiring from politics, Heap remained involved as an activist, strongly backing the anti-war movement, and supporting NDP candidates in the region. He also remained involved at the downtown Church of the Holy Trinity and social justice issues within the Anglican Church of Canada. In retirement, he preferred to go by the name "Don Heap", which he used before entering electoral politics in 1968.

In the late 1980s, he and his wife Alice sold their family home in Toronto's Kensington Market area at a fraction of the market price to the Homes First Society, a community organization which provides housing for refugees. The house had been a nexus for meetings and organizing among student activists around the anti-war, anti-apartheid and social housing movements from the 1960s to the 1980s with as many as a dozen young people staying with the Heap family at one time.

In his late seventies and early eighties he remained involved in various issues such as refugee rights. Heap co-founded the Toronto Disaster Relief Committee to campaign on the issue of homelessness.

Heap suffered a heart attack in 2005 and was also diagnosed with Alzheimer's disease in 2006. In 2011, he and his wife faced eviction from their retirement home as they awaited admission to a long-term care facility, for which they had been on a waiting list for five years. In October 2011, Heap was admitted to the Kensington Gardens facility and his wife Alice got a spot there later that month. Alice Heap, his wife of 61 years, died due to complications from pneumonia on March 24, 2012, at the age of 86.

Heap died on April 25, 2014. One of his sons posted a message remembering him as an "advocate of the homeless, for refugees and for peace [among other causes]" and also as a "Pacifist, socialist, worker-priest, marxist Anglican, trade-unionist, city councillor, member of parliament, civilly disobedient marcher for human rights. Wearer of red shirts, cyclist, paddler of canoes, singer of songs."

Tributes
A sole support mother that Heap helped get childcare in the 1980s, later taught nursing at George Brown College. In 2013, Nadira Fraser established the "Dan and Alice Heap Bursary" to aid single parents to qualify for nursing. The couple also has an athletic award which is attributed to their namesake, The Don & Alice Heap Rugby for all Athletic Award. heaped.

Electoral history

Spadina

St. Andrew—St. Patrick

Toronto City Council (Ward 6)
1972
Ward 6 (Financial District, Toronto - University of Toronto)
x-William Archer - 7,395
x-Dan Heap (reform) - 7,153
June Marks (incumbent) - 6,396
Horace Brown (incumbent) - 2,928
Arthur Downes - 2,127

1974
Ward 6 (Financial District, Toronto - University of Toronto)
x-Dan Heap (incumbent)
x-Allan Sparrow
William Archer (incumbent)
K Dock Yip
John Comos
Arthur Downes
Fred Nelson

1976
Ward 6 (Financial District, Toronto - University of Toronto)
x-Dan Heap (incumbent) - 8,503
x-Allan Sparrow (incumbent) - 8,103
Peter Budd - 4,448
Arnold Linelsky - 2,046

1978
Ward 6 (Financial District, Toronto - University of Toronto)
x-Allan Sparrow (incumbent) - 8,029
x-Dan Heap (incumbent) - 7,514
Dan Richards - 6,421
Rose Smith - 2,785
Joe Martin - 1,143

1980
Ward 6 (Financial District, Toronto - University of Toronto)
x-Gordon Chong  - 9,522
x-Dan Heap (incumbent) - 9,341
George Hislop - 7,348
Rose Smith - 2,959
Fred Chappell - 1,339
Darryl Randall - 659
Gary Weagle - 505

Spadina

Trinity—Spadina

Archives 

There is a Dan Heap fonds at Library and Archives Canada. Archival reference number is R11601.

References

External links

1925 births
2014 deaths
Anglican socialists
Anglican pacifists
Canadian Anglican priests
Canadian Christian pacifists
Canadian Christian socialists
Canadian Marxists
Converts to Anglicanism from Presbyterianism
McGill University alumni
Members of the House of Commons of Canada from Ontario
Metropolitan Toronto councillors
New Democratic Party MPs
Politicians from Winnipeg
Queen's University at Kingston alumni
Toronto city councillors
Trade unionists from Manitoba
Trade unionists from Ontario
Upper Canada College alumni
Canadian Army personnel of World War II
Canadian Army personnel
Canadian military personnel from Manitoba